John Lawrence Ashbery (July 28, 1927 – September 3, 2017) was an American poet and art critic.

Ashbery is considered the most influential American poet of his time. Oxford University literary critic John Bayley wrote that Ashbery "sounded, in poetry, the standard tones of the age." Langdon Hammer, chair of the English Department at Yale University, wrote in 2008, "No figure looms so large in American poetry over the past 50 years as John Ashbery" and "No American poet has had a larger, more diverse vocabulary, not Whitman, not Pound." Stephanie Burt, a poet and Harvard professor of English, has compared Ashbery to T. S. Eliot, calling Ashbery "the last figure whom half the English-language poets alive thought a great model, and the other half thought incomprehensible".

Ashbery published more than 20 volumes of poetry and won nearly every major American award for poetry, including a Pulitzer Prize in 1976 for his collection Self-Portrait in a Convex Mirror. Renowned for its postmodern complexity and opacity, his work still proves controversial. Ashbery said he wished his work to be accessible to as many people as possible, not a private dialogue with himself. At the same time, he once joked that some critics still view him as "a harebrained, homegrown surrealist whose poetry defies even the rules and logic of Surrealism."

Life

Ashbery was born in Rochester, New York, the son of Helen (née Lawrence), a biology teacher, and Chester Frederick Ashbery, a farmer. He was raised on a farm near Lake Ontario; his brother died when they were children. Ashbery was educated at Deerfield Academy, an all-boys school, where he read such poets as W. H. Auden and Dylan Thomas and began writing poetry. Two of his poems were published in Poetry magazine by a classmate who had submitted them under his own name, without Ashbery's knowledge or permission. Ashbery also published a piece of short fiction and a handful of poems—including a sonnet about his frustrated love for a fellow student—in the school newspaper, the Deerfield Scroll. His first ambition was to be a painter: from the age of 11 until he was 15, Ashbery took weekly classes at the art museum in Rochester.

Ashbery graduated in 1949 with an A.B., cum laude, from Harvard College, where he was a member of the Harvard Advocate, the university's literary magazine, and the Signet Society. He wrote his senior thesis on the poetry of W. H. Auden. At Harvard he befriended fellow writers Kenneth Koch, Barbara Epstein, V. R. Lang, Frank O'Hara and Edward Gorey, and was a classmate of Robert Creeley, Robert Bly and Peter Davison. Ashbery went on to study briefly at New York University before receiving an M.A. from Columbia University in 1951.

After working as a copywriter in New York from 1951 to 1955, from the mid-1950s, when he received a Fulbright Fellowship, through 1965, Ashbery lived in France. He was an editor of the 12 issues of Art and Literature (1964–67) and the New Poetry issue of Harry Mathews' Locus Solus (# 3/4; 1962). To make ends meet he translated French murder mysteries, served as the art editor for the European edition of the New York Herald Tribune and was an art critic for Art International (1960–65) and a Paris correspondent for ARTnews (1963–66), when Thomas Hess took over as editor. During this period he lived with the French poet Pierre Martory, whose books Every Question but One (1990), The Landscape is behind the Door (1994) and The Landscapist he translated (2008), as he did Arthur Rimbaud (Illuminations), Max Jacob (The Dice Cup), Pierre Reverdy (Haunted House), and many titles by Raymond Roussel. After returning to the United States, he continued his career as an art critic for New York and Newsweek magazines while also serving on the editorial board of ARTnews until 1972. Several years later, he began a stint as an editor at Partisan Review, serving from 1976 to 1980.

During the fall of 1963, Ashbery became acquainted with Andy Warhol at a scheduled poetry reading at the Literary Theatre in New York. He had previously written favorable reviews of Warhol's art. That same year he reviewed Warhol's Flowers exhibition at Galerie Ileana Sonnabend in Paris, describing Warhol's visit to Paris as "the biggest transatlantic fuss since Oscar Wilde brought culture to Buffalo in the nineties". Ashbery returned to New York near the end of 1965 and was welcomed with a large party at the Factory. He became close friends with poet Gerard Malanga, Warhol's assistant, on whom he had an important influence as a poet. In 1967 his poem Europe was used as the central text in Eric Salzman's Foxes and Hedgehogs as part of the New Image of Sound series at Hunter College, conducted by Dennis Russell Davies. When the poet sent Salzman Three Madrigals in 1968, the composer featured them in the seminal Nude Paper Sermon, released by Nonesuch Records in 1989.

In the early 1970s, Ashbery began teaching at Brooklyn College, where his students included poet John Yau. He was elected a Fellow of the American Academy of Arts and Sciences in 1983. In the 1980s, he moved to Bard College, where he was the Charles P. Stevenson, Jr., Professor of Languages and Literature, until 2008, when he retired but continued to win awards, present readings, and work with graduate and undergraduates at many other institutions. He was the poet laureate of New York State from 2001 to 2003, and also served for many years as a chancellor of the Academy of American Poets. He served on the contributing editorial board of the literary journal Conjunctions. In 2008 Ashbery was named the first poet laureate of MtvU, a division of MTV broadcast to U.S. college campuses, with excerpts from his poems featured in 18 promotional spots and the works in their entirety on the broadcaster's website.

Ashbery was a Millet Writing Fellow at Wesleyan University in 2010, and participated in Wesleyan's Distinguished Writers Series. He was a founding member of The Raymond Roussel Society, with Miquel Barceló, Joan Bofill-Amargós, Michel Butor, Thor Halvorssen and Hermes Salceda.

Ashbery lived in New York City and Hudson, New York, with his husband, David Kermani. He died of natural causes on September 3, 2017, at his home in Hudson, at the age of 90.

Work

Ashbery's long list of awards began with the Yale Younger Poets Prize in 1956. The selection, by W. H. Auden, of Ashbery's first collection, Some Trees, later caused some controversy. The volume was screened out in the contest's early stages and was given to Auden by Chester Kallman after Auden had decided not to award the prize that year because of the poor quality of the volumes he received. Ashbery's early work shows the influence of Auden, along with Wallace Stevens, Boris Pasternak, and many of the French surrealists (his translations from French literature are numerous), though he claimed in a 1956 letter to "hate all modern French poetry, except for Raymond Roussel" and to like his own "wildly inaccurate translations of some of the 20th-century ones, but not the originals".

In the late 1950s, John Bernard Myers, co-owner of the Tibor de Nagy Gallery, categorized Ashbery's avant-garde poetry and that of Kenneth Koch, Frank O'Hara, James Schuyler, Barbara Guest, Kenward Elmslie and others as a "New York School", despite their very different styles. In 1953 Myers launched the magazine Semi-Colon, in which New York School poets appeared amid an eclectic mix of authors, such as Auden, James Ingram Merill and Saul Bellow.

Ashbery published some work in the avant-garde little magazine Nomad at the beginning of the 1960s. He then wrote two collections while in France, the highly controversial The Tennis Court Oath (1962) and Rivers and Mountains (1966), before returning to New York to write The Double Dream of Spring, published in 1970.

Increasing critical recognition in the 1970s transformed Ashbery from an obscure avant-garde experimentalist into one of America's most important poets (though still one of its most controversial). After the publication of Three Poems (1973) came Self-portrait in a Convex Mirror, for which he was awarded the three major American poetry awards: the Pulitzer Prize, the National Book Award, and the National Book Critics Circle Award. The collection's title poem is considered one of the masterpieces of late 20th century American poetic literature.

His subsequent collection, the more difficult Houseboat Days (1977), reinforced Ashbery's reputation, as did 1979's As We Know, which contains the long, double-columned poem "Litany." In 1988, his "Bridge Poem" was installed, using metal letters, on the 375-foot-wide Irene Hixon Whitney Bridge in Minneapolis; the poet was selected by the bridge's architect, artist Siah Armajani, and commissioned by the Walker Art Center. By the 1980s and 1990s, Ashbery had become a central figure in American and more broadly English-language poetry, as his number of imitators attested.

Ashbery's works are characterized by a free-flowing, often disjunctive syntax; extensive linguistic play, often infused with considerable humor; and a prosaic, sometimes disarmingly flat or parodic tone. The play of the human mind is the subject of a great many of his poems. He once said that his goal was "to produce a poem that the critic cannot even talk about". Formally, the earliest poems show the influence of conventional poetic practice, yet by The Tennis Court Oath a much more revolutionary engagement with form appears. Ashbery returned to something approaching a reconciliation between tradition and innovation with many of the poems in The Double Dream of Spring, though his Three Poems are written in long blocks of prose. Although he never again approached the radical experimentation of The Tennis Court Oath poems or The Skaters and "Into the Dusk-Charged Air" from his collection Rivers and Mountains, syntactic and semantic experimentation, linguistic expressiveness, deft, often abrupt shifts of register, and insistent wit remained consistent elements of his work.

Ashbery's art criticism has been collected in the 1989 volume Reported Sightings, Art Chronicles 1957–1987, edited by the poet David Bergman. He wrote one novel, A Nest of Ninnies, with fellow poet James Schuyler, and in his 20s and 30s penned several plays, three of which have been collected in Three Plays (1978). Ashbery's Charles Eliot Norton Lectures at Harvard University were published as Other Traditions in 2000. A larger collection of his prose writings, Selected Prose, appeared in 2005. In 2008, his Collected Poems 1956–1987 was published as part of the Library of America series. This made Ashbery the first living poet to have his work published by the LOA.

Awards and honors

 1956: Yale Younger Poets Prize, for Some Trees (1956) awarded by W.H. Auden
 1962: Ingram Merrill Foundation Fellowship
 1972: Ingram Merrill Foundation Fellowship
 1976: National Book Award for Self-Portrait in a Convex Mirror (1975).
 1976: National Book Critics Circle Award for Self-Portrait in a Convex Mirror (1975).
 1976: Pulitzer Prize in Poetry for Self-Portrait in a Convex Mirror (1975).
 1984: Lenore Marshall Poetry Prize for A Wave (1984)
 1984: Bollingen Prize in Poetry for A Wave (1984)
 1985: MacArthur Fellows Program Fellowship
 1987: Golden Plate Award of the American Academy of Achievement
 1995: Robert Frost Medal
 2002: Bestowed the rank of Officier de la Légion d'honneur by the Republic of France.
 2005: finalist for National Book Award for Where Shall I Wander (2005)
 2008: Robert Creeley Award
 2008: America Award for a lifetime contribution to international writing
 2011 National Humanities Medal
 2011: Inducted into the New York Writers Hall of Fame
 2011: National Book Foundation Medal for Distinguished Contribution to American Letters
 2017: The Raymond Roussel Society Medal

Bibliography

Poetry

Collections

 Turandot and other poems (1953)
 Some Trees (1956), winner of the 1955 Yale Series of Younger Poets
 The Tennis Court Oath (1962)
 Rivers and Mountains (1966)
 The Double Dream of Spring (1970)
 Three Poems (1972)
 The Vermont Notebook (1975), illustrated prose poems
 Self-portrait in a Convex Mirror (1975), awarded the Pulitzer Prize, the National Book Award and the National Book Critics Circle Award
 Houseboat Days (1977)
 As We Know (1979)
 Shadow Train (1981)
 A Wave (1984), awarded the Lenore Marshall Poetry Prize and the Bollingen Prize
 April Galleons (1987)
 Flow Chart (1991), book-length poem
 Hotel Lautréamont (1992)
 And the Stars Were Shining (1994)
 Can You Hear, Bird? (1995)
 The Mooring of Starting Out: The First Five Books of Poetry (1997)
 Wakefulness (1998)
 Girls on the Run (1999), a book-length poem inspired by the work of Henry Darger
 Your Name Here (2000)
 As Umbrellas Follow Rain (2001)
 Chinese Whispers (2002)
 Where Shall I Wander (2005) (finalist for the National Book Award)
 Notes from the Air: Selected Later Poems (2007) (winner of the 2008 International Griffin Poetry Prize)
 A Worldly Country (2007)
 Planisphere (2009)
 Collected Poems 1956–87 (Carcanet Press) (2010), ed. Mark Ford
 Quick Question (2012)
 Breezeway (2015)
 Commotion of the Birds (2016)
 They Knew What They Wanted: Collages and Poems (2018)
 Parallel Movement of the Hands: Five Unfinished Longer Works (2021)

Poems

Prose, plays and translations
 A Nest of Ninnies (1969), with James Schuyler. (Carcanet Press 1987, Paladin Books 1990) 
 Three Plays (1978). Carcanet Press (1988).
 
 The Ice Storm (1987), (32-page pamphlet)
 Reported Sightings: Art Chronicles, 1957–1987 (1989) (Alfred A. Knopf), ed. David Bergman, Art Criticism and Commentary
 Other Traditions(2001)
 100 Multiple-Choice Questions (2000) (reprint of 1970 experimental pamphlet)
 Selected Prose 1953–2003 (2005)
 Martory, Pierre The Landscapist Ashbery (Tr.) Carcanet Press (2008)
 Rimbaud, Arthur Illuminations Ashbery (Tr.) W. W. Norton & Company (2011)
 Collected French Translations: Poetry, edited by Rosanne Wasserman and Eugene Richie (2014)
 Collected French Translations: Prose, edited by Rosanne Wasserman and Eugene Richie (2014)

References

Further reading
 Kacper Bartczak, In Search of Communication and Community: the Poetry of John Ashbery (Peter Lang, 2006)
 Harold Bloom, Figures of Capable Imagination
 Harold Bloom, ed., Modern Critical Views: John Ashbery (Chelsea House Publishers, 1985)
 Andrew Dubois, Ashbery's Forms of Attention (University of Alabama Press, 2006)
 Andrew Epstein, Beautiful Enemies: Friendship and Postwar American Poetry (Oxford University Press, 2006)
 David Herd, John Ashbery and American Poetry (Manchester University Press, 2000)
 Ben Hickman, John Ashbery and English Poetry (Edinburgh University Press, 2012)
 David Lehman, The Last Avant-Garde: The Making of The New York School of Poets (Anchor Books, 1999)
 David Lehman, ed., Beyond Amazement: New Essays on John Ashbery (Cornell University Press, 1980)
 David Perkins, A History of Modern Poetry, Volume II, Modernism and After (Harvard University Press, 1987)
 Laura Quinney, The Poetics of Disappointment: Wordsworth to Ashbery
 David Shapiro, John Ashbery: An Introduction to the Poetry (Columbia University Press, 1979)
 John Shoptaw, On the Outside Looking Out: John Ashbery's Poetry (Harvard University Press, 1995)
 Stephen Shore, Lynne Tillman, The Velvet Years: Warhol's Factory 1965–1967
 Susan M. Schultz, ed., The Tribe of John: Ashbery and Contemporary Poetry (The University of Alabama Press, 1995)
 Mark Silverberg, The New York School Poets and the Neo-Avant-Garde (Ashgate, 2010)
 Helen Vendler, Soul Says (Harvard University Press, 1996)
 John Emil Vincent, John Ashbery and You: His Later Books (University of Georgia Press, 2007)

External links

  Ben Lerner on John Ashbery in The New Yorker
 ‘a serpentine | Gesture’: The Synthetic Reconstruction of Ashbery’s Poetic Voice in Cordite Poetry Review
 Poems by John Ashbery at PoetryFoundation.org
 The Ashbery Resource Center
 John Ashbery at EPC
 John Ashbery—the Academy of American Poets
 
 
 Audio recordings from Key West Literary Seminar, 2003: Ashbery reading from Chinese Whispers; Ashbery's 'mini-lecture' on Elizabeth Bishop
 Audio recordings of John Ashbery , from the Woodberry Poetry Room, Harvard University
 Carcanet Press – John Ashbery's UK publisher
 Griffin Poetry Prize biography
 Griffin Poetry Prize reading, including video clip
 Modern American Poetry, critical essays on Ashbery's works
 Bookworm Interviews (Audio) with Michael Silverblatt: May 2007, May 2009, April 2010
 John Ashbery by Adam Fitzgerald in BOMB Magazine

1927 births
2017 deaths
Poets from New York (state)
Members of the American Academy of Arts and Letters
Columbia Graduate School of Arts and Sciences alumni
Writers from Manhattan
New York University alumni
Harvard College alumni
MacArthur Fellows
American gay writers
Deerfield Academy alumni
New York School poets
Poets Laureate of New York (state)
Wesleyan University people
National Book Award winners
Pulitzer Prize for Poetry winners
Bard College faculty
Fellows of the American Academy of Arts and Sciences
Postmodern writers
Bollingen Prize recipients
American LGBT poets
LGBT people from New York (state)
The New Yorker people
National Humanities Medal recipients
American art critics
American male poets
Harvard Advocate alumni
Brooklyn College faculty
LGBT academics
Fulbright alumni
Gay poets